Trox plicatus is a beetle of the family Trogidae.

References 

plicatus
Beetles described in 1940